EchoStar IV is a communications satellite operated by EchoStar. Launched in 1998 it was operated in geostationary orbit at a longitude of 77 degrees west for 12 years.

Satellite 
The launch of EchoStar IV made use of a Proton rocket flying from Site 81 at the Baikonur Cosmodrome, Kazakhstan. The launch took place at 23:45 UTC on May 7, 1998, with the spacecraft entering a geosynchronous transfer orbit. EchoStar IV carried 32 Ku band transponders to provide direct voice and video communications to small dishes in North America after parking over 119° W or 148° W longitude.

Specifications 
 Launch mass: 
 Power: 2 deployable solar arrays, batteries
 Stabilization: 3-axis
 Propulsion: LEROS-1C
 Longitude: 77° west

See also

 1998 in spaceflight

References

Spacecraft launched in 1998
Communications satellites in geostationary orbit
Satellites using the A2100 bus
Spacecraft launched by Proton rockets
Derelict satellites orbiting Earth
E04